The 2009 Skybet World Grand Prix was the twelfth instance of the darts tournament held by the Professional Darts Corporation, the World Grand Prix. It was held from 5–11 October 2009. It was staged at the Citywest Hotel in Dublin, Ireland. The event featured a tournament record prize fund of £350,000 with £100,000 going to the winner.

Phil Taylor successfully defended his title, beating Raymond van Barneveld 6-3 in the final to win the World Grand Prix for the ninth time.

Format
The tournament's usual format was in play with the usual 501 legs double-in double-out format (the World Grand Prix remains the only televised darts tournament to use the double-in format). The first round's games were best of 3 sets - the quickfire nature of this round means shocks are frequent in this round, not least involving eight-time champion Phil Taylor who, three times, has gone out in the first round here. Second round games were best of 5 sets, the quarter finals best of 7 sets, the semi finals best of 9 sets, and the final was best of 11 sets. All sets were best of 5 legs/first to three legs.

Prize money
A tournament record prize fund of £350,000 was available to the participants, divided based on the following performances:

Qualification
The field of 32 players was mostly made up from the top 16 players in the PDC Order of Merit on September 7, following the two Players Championship events in Salzburg, Austria. The top 8 from these rankings were also the seeded players. The remaining 16 places went to the top 12 non-qualified players from the 2009 Players Championship Order of Merit, and then to the top 4 non-qualified residents of the Republic of Ireland and Northern Ireland from the 2009 Players Championship Order of Merit who have competed in at least six Players Championship events.

Draw

Statistics

Television coverage and sponsorship

As usual and since its inception the tournament was screened by Sky Sports.

The tournament was sponsored for the last time by Sky Bet after five years.

References

External links
World Grand Prix page on the PDC's official website

World Grand Prix (darts)
World Grand Prix Darts